A nacatamal is a traditional dish found in Nicaragua and Honduras similar to the tamal and to the hallaca. Its name originates from the Nawat language spoken by the Nicarao, which were situated on the Southern Pacific coast of Nicaragua, and translates to 'meat tamale'. The nacatamal is perhaps the most produced within traditional Nicaraguan cuisine and is typically eaten on the weekend, for dinner, or for breakfast; it is usually eaten together with white bread and a caffeinated drink like black coffee, Coca-Cola or Pepsi. It is common to enjoy nacatamales (plural) during special occasions and to invite extended family and neighbors to partake.

Ingredients
A nacatamal is made up of mostly nixtamalized corn masa (a kind of dough traditionally made from a process called nizquezar) and lard, but includes seasonings such as salt and achiote (annatto). This combination is traditionally cooked in a large batch over a wood fire. The result becomes the base for the nacatamal and it is also referred to as masa. This base is ladled onto plantain leaves used for wrapping into large individual portions. The leaves undergo their own preparation separately. Before a nacatamal can be wrapped and brought to the last stage of the cooking process, it must be filled. The filling usually consists of annatto-seasoned pork meat; rice; slices of potatoes, bell peppers, tomatoes, and onions; olives; spearmint sprigs; and chile , a very small, egg-shaped chile found in Nicaragua. On occasion, prunes, raisins or capers can be added. The masa and filling are then wrapped in the plantain leaves, tied with a string, and made into pillow-shaped bundles. These nacatamales are then steamed or pressure-cooked for several hours. The entire process is very labor-intensive and it often requires preparation over the course of two days; it may be necessary to involve the whole family to complete it.

Today it is common to wrap nacatamales in both banana leaf and aluminum foil before cooking. Cooking takes up to five hours and at the midway point the nacatamales are turned over to facilitate even cooking.

See also
 List of maize dishes
 List of stuffed dishes

References 

Nicaraguan cuisine
Honduran cuisine
Maize dishes
Stuffed dishes
Guatemalan cuisine